Lebedyn is a former air base in Ukraine located 5 km southeast of Lebedyn city in Sumy Oblast.  It is a badly neglected 1960s-era airstrip, and was likely intended for wartime aircraft dispersals.

References
RussianAirFields.com

Soviet Air Force bases